Netter's Essential Histology is a textbook/atlas of human histology authored by William K. Ovalle and Patrick C. Nahirney. Drawings by medical illustrator, Frank H. Netter, with contributing artwork by James A. Perkins, Joe Chovan, John A. Craig, and Carlos A.G. Machado, are in the book.  First published in English in 2008 by Elsevier/ Saunders, a 2nd edition was released in 2013. Subsequent editions in Portuguese, Korean, Greek, Turkish, and Italian have also been printed. The first Southeast Asia edition was released in English in 2015.

Directed to today’s problem-based, integrated curricula in medicine and dentistry, it is also intended for allied health care professionals, clinical residents, teachers, and researchers. A pictorial guide that highlights relevant microscopic and functional features of cells, tissues and organs of the body, the book has been recognized as "concisely written text with emphasis on concepts and not on details, supported by illustrations as well as light and electron micrographs".

Book contents can be accessed online; its resources include an image and virtual slide library with 20 high-resolution digitized light microscopic slides, 225 ‘zoomifiable’ electron micrographs, and short narrated video overviews of each of 20 chapters.

A separate, updated set of Netter’s Histology Flashcards (by the same authors) is in its 2nd edition. These more than 200 visual aids help in recognition and interpretation of microscopic sections at a glance, and also reinforce clinical relevance.

Table of contents

Cell and Tissues 

 The Cell
 Epithelium and Exocrine Glands
 Connective Tissue
 Muscle Tissue
 Nervous Tissue
 Cartilage and Bone
 Blood and Bone Marrow

Systems

Reception 
In 2008, the book won British Medical Association’s Best Illustrated Book Award.  It has also been praised as "an excellent textbook with exquisite illustrations and micrographs that provide a broad coverage of histology with clinical correlations". "The book is successful in bridging the gap between gross anatomy and microscopic anatomy" (Published review by Dr.George Niiro: Doody Review: 5 stars)".

References

External links 
 Netter Images
 University of British Columbia, Department of Cellular and Physiological Sciences
 University of Victoria

Histology
2013 establishments in the United States